Green Bridge may refer to:

Structures
 Pedestrian separation structure, a structure that removes pedestrians from a vehicle roadway
 Wildlife crossing, a bridge built to allow wildlife to move over highways safely
 Green Bridge (filtration system), a water filtration system

Bridges

United States
 Green Bridge (Las Cruces, New Mexico), listed on the National Register of Historic Places in Dona Ana County, New Mexico
 Green Bridge (New Orleans)
 Pasco-Kennewick Bridge (1922), Pasco-Kennewick, Washington
 Sundial Bridge at Turtle Bay, Redding, California USA
 Green Bridge (Manatee River), a Special routes of U.S. Route 41, Manatee County, Florida
 Frank J. Wood Bridge, a three span truss style bridge built in 1932, connecting Brunswick and Topsham, Maine

Other countries
 Eleanor Schonell Bridge, originally "Green Bridge", at the University of Queensland, Australia
 Montreal/Laval Green Bridge, Canada
 Green Bridge (Vilnius), Vilnius, Lithuania
 Green Bridge (St. Petersburg), Saint Petersburg, Russia
 Green Bridge of Wales, a natural arch on the Pembrokeshire coast

Other
 Greenbridge science park, in Ostend, Belgium

See also